The Men's solo technical routine competition of the 2022 European Aquatics Championships was held on 12 August 2022. 

It marked the first time male artistic swimmers competed in a solo event at a LEN European Aquatics Championships.

Results
The final was held on 12 August at 16:30.

References 
 

 
Artistic